Guy Serle Goodwin-Gill (born 25 December 1946) is a barrister and a professor of public international law at Oxford University and a Fellow of All Souls College, Oxford.

His research areas include international organisations, human rights, migrants and refugees, elections and democratisation and children’s rights; he teaches Human Rights and International Law. He currently serves as the Acting Director of the Andrew and Renata Kaldor Centre for International Refugee Law at the University of New South Wales.

The Palestine Question

Goodwin-Gill became noted for his contributions to the debate around international law and the Palestine question. He served as part of the advisory team which presented the Palestinian point of view with regards to the Israeli "Separation Wall" or "Separation Fence" on the Palestinian West Bank, which culminated in a 2004 ruling by the UN-affiliated International Court of Justice that the barrier was illegal. He later used his work on this case as part of a BDS-led push to have Israel's bid for membership to the OECD rejected, but Israel membership was granted in 2010.

In 2011, Goodwin-Gill wrote a legal opinion which recommended that the Palestinian National Authority not seek recognition of Palestine as a member state of the United Nations on the grounds that such a move would deprive the considerable Palestinian diaspora of legal representation within the putative state.

Lectures
 Migrants' Rights in the Lecture Series of the United Nations Audiovisual Library of International Law
 International Migration Law - A General Introduction in the Lecture Series of the United Nations Audiovisual Library of International Law
 Forced Migration - The Evolution of International Refugee Law and Organization in the Lecture Series of the United Nations Audiovisual Library of International Law
 Expulsion in Public International Law in the Lecture Series of the United Nations Audiovisual Library of International Law

Further reading
 Introductory note on the Convention relating to the Status of Refugees and the Protocol relating to the Status of Refugees in the Historic Archives of the United Nations Audiovisual Library of International Law
 Introductory note on the Convention relating to the Status of Stateless Persons in the Historic Archives of the United Nations Audiovisual Library of International Law
 Introductory note on the Convention on the Reduction of Statelessness in the Historic Archives of the United Nations Audiovisual Library of International Law
 Introductory note on the Declaration on Territorial Asylum in the Historic Archives of the United Nations Audiovisual Library of International Law

References

External links 
 Web site
 Web site
 Article in The Observer

Members of the Inner Temple
Living people
Fellows of All Souls College, Oxford
1946 births
Alumni of Wadham College, Oxford
People educated at Mill Hill School
Academic staff of Carleton University
Academic staff of the University of New South Wales